Filippo Turati (26 November 1857 – 29 March 1932) was an Italian sociologist, criminologist, poet and socialist politician.

Early life
Born in Canzo, province of Como, he graduated in law at the University of Bologna in 1877, and participated in the Scapigliatura movement with the most important artists of the period in Milan, publishing poetry. His Inno dei Lavoratori ("Workers' Hymn"), adapted to music, became the most popular song of the nascent labor movement.

Turati became interested in politics, being attracted to the democratic movement before joining the more specific Socialist groups. His most important sociological work of this period is Il Delitto e la Questione Sociale, in which he examines how social conditions affect crime. He met Anna Kulischov while working on a survey of social conditions in Naples. Kulischov was an exile from Russia who had become the companion of Andrea Costa, an Anarchist leader – when she converted to non-Anarchist Socialism, Costa followed, sending an important letter to his anarchist comrades in which he abandoned the movement. Kulischov and Costa had split by the time she met Turati. The two immediately fell in love, and lived together until her death in 1925.

In France, Turati had a close relationship with the Italian lawyer Giuseppe Leti (1866–1939), former head of the Supreme Council of the Scottish Rite national Freemasonry who resided in France from 1929 to 1937. Leti was familiar with other Italian anti-fascist politicians such as Francesco Saverio Nitti,
Alberto Cianca, Pietro Nenni, Emanuele Modigliani and Emilio Lussu.

Socialist Party

Turati joined the socialist Italian Workers' Party (POI) in 1886. He and Anna Kulischov were the most instrumental intellectuals involved in the founding of the Italian Socialist Party (PSI) in 1892 (it took that name in 1895). They were reformists, believing that Socialism would come about gradually, primarily through action in the Italian Parliament, labor organization, and education, spreading their ideas through their journal Critica Sociale – a review founded by their friend Arcangelo Ghisleri under the title Cuore e Critica. It was the most influential Marxist review in Italy before World War I. Shut down by Benito Mussolini's Fascist regime, it was reestablished after World War II, and is still in print.

In the years following the party's foundation, the Italian government attempted to suppress it. Turati advocated alliances with other Italian democratic forces, meant to defeat the government's reactionary policies, and to advance left-wing causes. In 1898 Turati was arrested and charged with being the inspirator of the popular riot that broke out in the whole country against the rise of the bread price. He was freed the following year.

Under Prime Minister Luigi Pelloux, the country was governed by a highly conservative politicians which were met with stiff resistance from the left, and in 1899 they were defeated thanks in large part to the PSI's policies. In 1901, Giuseppe Zanardelli, a Liberal, became Prime Minister – accompanied by Giovanni Giolitti as the Minister of the Interior – Giolitti who would dominate Italian politics until 1915. This Liberal cabinet risked losing a vote in Parliament, with the possibility that a more conservative politician, Sidney Sonnino, would come to power; Turati urged that the Socialist deputies vote for the Zanardelli government. When the party Directorate refused to sanction the vote, he convinced the deputies to do so anyway.

The vote brought the incipient split in the party between right and left wings to a head, even if the Liberal government had allowed workers the right to strike, and despite the fact that the subsequent strike wave resulted in improved conditions in industry and on the land. Between 1901 and 1906, power in the party seesawed between the Turati-led reformists and the revolutionaries under various leaders. After 1906, splits surfaced among the reformists themselves. In 1912, as a result of Socialist reaction against the Italo-Turkish War (1911–1912), revolutionaries took over the party. Benito Mussolini, one of their leaders, became editor of the party newspaper Avanti!; Turati opposed Mussolini, but proved unable to dislodge him. He had opposed the conflict, and would oppose Italy's entrance into World War I – while Mussolini moved to an irredentist position (and came to be expelled from the PSI after arguing for Italy to join the Entente Powers).  Despite the fact that he was a pacifist in June 1918 he strongly supported the Italian Army that was fighting the Battle of Solstizio.

Opposition to Fascism

Following World War I, Mussolini created the paramilitary Fasces of Revolutionary Action, then renamed Fasces of Italian Combat in 1919 and finally National Fascist Party in 1921, and he came to power in 1922 (after the March on Rome). Filippo Turati and Anna Kulischov, who knew Mussolini well, were major opponents of fascism, and lived under constant surveillance and threats. In a series of prescient speeches, Turati argued that the new revolutionary program adopted by the PSI in 1919 would lead to disaster, and he advocated political alliances with other opponents of Fascism. This policy was rejected and the PSI split in 1921, with the formation of the Communist Party of Italy. In 1922, when Turati's group was expelled and established a new group, the Unitary Socialist Party (PSU). In 1924, Turati's disciple and Secretary of the PSU, Giacomo Matteotti, was assassinated by Mussolini's Ceka; this seminal event prompted Mussolini to formalize his dictatorship between 1925 and 1926.

In 1926, Turati fled Italy in a dramatic escape to France – aided by Riccardo Bauer, Carlo Rosselli, Ferruccio Parri, Sandro Pertini (the future President of the Italian Republic) and Adriano Olivetti, of the eponymous typewriter company. In Paris, he was the soul of the non-Communist anti-fascist resistance, traveling across Europe and alerting democrats to the Fascist danger – which he saw as a phenomenon with far-reaching consequences. He died in the French capital in March 1932.

After World War II, Turati's remains were transferred after to Milan's Cimitero Monumentale, where he was buried next to Anna Kulischov.

In the Florestano Vancini's film The Assassination of Matteotti (1973), Turati is played by Gastone Moschin.

References

Further reading

External links
 

1857 births
1932 deaths
People from the Province of Como
People of the Kingdom of Lombardy–Venetia
Italian Socialist Party politicians
Unitary Socialist Party (Italy, 1922) politicians
Deputies of Legislature XIX of the Kingdom of Italy
Deputies of Legislature XX of the Kingdom of Italy
Deputies of Legislature XXI of the Kingdom of Italy
Deputies of Legislature XXII of the Kingdom of Italy
Deputies of Legislature XXIII of the Kingdom of Italy
Deputies of Legislature XXIV of the Kingdom of Italy
Deputies of Legislature XXV of the Kingdom of Italy
Deputies of Legislature XXVI of the Kingdom of Italy
Deputies of Legislature XXVII of the Kingdom of Italy
Politicians of Lombardy
Italian anti-fascists
Italian essayists
Male essayists
19th-century Italian journalists
Italian male journalists
Italian poets
Italian male poets
Italian sociologists
Italian criminologists
Italian expatriates in France
Exiled Italian politicians
Italian male non-fiction writers
Italian Aventinian secessionists
Italian political party founders
University of Bologna alumni
Burials at the Cimitero Monumentale di Milano